The Tournoi Perrier de Paris was a golf tournament on the Challenge Tour in 1993. It was played at Golf Euro Disney near Paris, France. It was won by future multiple major winner Phil Mickelson.

Winners

References

External links
Coverage on the Challenge Tour's official site

Former Challenge Tour events
Defunct golf tournaments in France